Ajit Singh Rathore "Jimmy" is an Indian Sound Designer from Indian film industry. He has designed sound for films such as Hasee Toh Phasee, Saare Jahan Se Mehnga, Jo Dooba So Paar, Zokkomon, Hansaa, Man's woman and other stories, Nainsukh, Sonchidi, Kramasha and many more.

He has designed sound for popular televisions shows like Fear Factor: Khatron Ke Khiladi Season 5 anchored by Rohit Shetty, Shyam Benegal's Samvidhaan, Zor Ka Jhatka anchored by Shahrukh Khan, which is an Indian version of AXN's show Wipeout. He has also composed title music for Indian version of Fear Factor anchored by Akshay Kumar.

The president of India, Mrs. Pratibha Patil awarded National Award for Best Sound Design for film “Kramasha” in 2009. 
Citation of the jury was: For the innovative Sound Design enhances the mood of the film and draws one into the magical ambience replete with fairy tales.

Early life & FTII 
He started playing drums at an early age of 14 and has also worked as a child actor in the educational film projects of government of India commissioned to Indian Space Development Organization (ISRO). His introduction to filmmaking and interest in music lead him to studying Audiography at Film and Television Institute of India (FTII) in Pune (Maharashtra), India, regulated by the Government of India.
At FTII he met Amit Dutta (direction student) and was the Sound Designer for his films like Kramasha, Jangadh, Man's woman and Other Stories, Nainsukh and Sonchidi, which they also co-produced together. In 2009, Ajit won a National Award for Best Sound Design for film “Kramasha” and in the same year won the Critics Award for Best Film for Man's Woman and Other Stories at Venice Film Festival (La Biennale di Venezzia) in 2009. His films have been a regular official entry in most of the prestigious film festival around the world.

Career 
He started his career as a Sound Recordist with Vidhu Vinod Chopra’s film Eklavya (starring Amitabh Bacchan, Saif Ali Khan and Jackie Shroff) as Foley FX supervisor, assisting Biswadeep Chatterjee. Did Sound Recording for Sushil Rajpal’s “Antardwand”, the film that got the National Award in 2009 as “The Best Film on Social Issue”. Joined Whistling Woods International, a film school started by renowned filmmaker Subhash Ghai, in department of Sound Design and Recording. He worked as an associate Sound Recordist to Sound Designer Manoj Sikka and worked on films like Chandni Chowk to China, Delhi Safari, Lamhaa, Kaalo. He currently works from his studio in Versova, Andheri West, Mumbai, India that houses multiple sound post production, music composing and programming set ups under one roof.

Documentaries 
He has done numerous documentaries like Cinema City Mumbai, multiple films on tribes of Maharashtra and Gujarat, 6 hour long docu-drama on spiritual guru Babuji Maharaj, Ad Films for Dungarpur Films which is one of the leading production houses in making Ad Films.

Music 
Between 2009-2013, he was the drummer of JFK (Just Folk Kit) band, which he co-founded with his Music composer friend Manish J. Tipu. They primarily played Indian Folk music from different parts of India and in different languages. He is part of a new band with Rakshit Thantry on Bass and Electronics and Brince Bora on Keyboard and Computers.

He has produced content as the director of the series of gigs called “Masters of Guitar”, which features collaboration between India's best Guitar players and renowned Guitar players from outside India. The first edition of “Masters of Guitar” featured Sushmit Sen (Guitar player, Indian Ocean) and Bernie Marsden (ex-lead Guitar player, Whitesnake, UK).

Filmography

Direction 

He has directed a corporate film for “Mahatma Gandhi College and Hospital” in Jaipur (Rajasthan) in the year 2008. He has shot live gigs for series “Masters of Guitar” Edition-1 featuring Sushmit Sen and Bernie Marsden.  
A documentary shot in London during the London 2012 Olympics.

Filmography as Director

Awards and honors
The president of India, Mrs. Pratibha Patil awarded National Award for “Best Sound Design” for Film “KRAMASHA” in the year 2009.

References

Living people
Indian sound designers
Year of birth missing (living people)